Arbër Avni Zeneli (born 25 February 1995) is a professional footballer who plays as a midfielder for French club Reims and the Kosovo national team. He previously represented Sweden at the international youth level and was a part of the Sweden U21 team that won the 2015 UEFA European Under-21 Championship.

Club career

IF Elfsborg

Youth teams
Zeneli started playing football for Hälsinggården, but left as a 12-year old for IF Elfsborg's youth academy. On 29 October 2011, he scored a late winning goal in the final of Swedish Under-17 Championships against Brommapojkarna. The following year he helped his team reach the final in the same competition and he scored another goal, although this time IF Elfsborg lost to Malmö. On 5 November 2013, he won the Allsvenskan U21 with IF Elfsborg against Häcken after coming on as a substitute at 63rd minute in place of Arjan Mostafa.

First team

Having been promoted to the senior team in December 2013. On 1 March 2014, he made his debut with IF Elfsborg in the group stage of 2013–14 Svenska Cupen against Östersunds after being named in the starting line-up and he went on to play a total of three games in the competition which IF Elfsborg later won beating Helsingborg in the final.

Zeneli made his first Allsvenskan appearance on 31 March after coming on as a substitute at 75th minute in place of injured Simon Hedlund in a 2–1 away defeat against Åtvidabergs. He played 16 games during the 2014 season and finished the season by scoring his first senior goal that subsequently sealed the win for his team against Brommapojkarna and he dedicated the goal to his former coach Klas Ingesson who had died a couple of days earlier.

Heerenveen
On 10 November 2015, Zeneli signed a three-and-a-half year contract with Eredivisie club Heerenveen. Heerenveen reportedly paid a €2 million transfer fee. On 16 January 2016, he made his debut in a 5–2 home win against PEC Zwolle after being named in the starting line-up. On 23 January 2016, Zeneli scored his first goal for Heerenveen in a 3–1 win against Willem II in Matchday 19 of 2015–16 Eredivisie, and his performance earned him the man of the match award.

Reims

2018–19 season
On 25 January 2019, Heerenveen announced for the contract negotiations between Zeneli and Reims. A day later, he joined Ligue 1 side Reims after agreeing to a five-year deal. Reims reportedly paid a €4 million transfer fee. On 2 February 2019, he made his debut in a 2–1 home win against Marseille after coming on as a substitute at 73rd minute in place of injured Mathieu Cafaro.

2019–20 season
During international duties in June 2019, he tore his anterior cruciate ligament and was sidelined for most of the 2019–20 season. After returning from injury, the Ligue 1 season was suspended indefinitely and since cancelled due to the COVID-19 pandemic.

2020–21 season
Zeneli returned to the pitch for the 2020–21 season, and made a total of 36 appearances in which he scored three goals. He also featured in the UEFA Europa League qualifiers with Reims, who were eventually knocked out by Fehérvár in the third round.

In August 2021, Zeneli tore his anterior cruciate ligament again, sidelining him for another extended period of time.

International career

Sweden

From 2010, until 2016, Zeneli has been part of Sweden at youth international level, respectively has been part of the U17, U19 and U21 teams and he with these teams played 35 matches and scored 7 goals. On 2 June 2015, he was named as part of the Sweden U21's 23-man squad for the 2015 UEFA European Under-21 Championship in Czech Republic, where was declared the champion even though he was an unused substitute in those matches.

Kosovo
On 24 August 2016, Zeneli decided to represent Kosovo at senior international level. On 2 October 2016, he received a call-up from Kosovo for a 2018 FIFA World Cup qualification matches against Croatia and Ukraine. On 6 October 2016, Zeneli made his debut with Kosovo in a 2018 FIFA World Cup qualification match against Croatia after being named in the starting line-up.

Personal life
Zeneli was born in Säter, Sweden to Kosovan parents from Selac, a village near Mitrovica, but grew up in Falun, before moving to Borås with his family when he was 11 years old. Zeneli has named his father Avni as his greatest role model in life. He is the older brother of the Kosovan footballer Besfort Zeneli.

Career statistics

Club

International

International goalsScores and results list Kosovo's goal tally first.

Honours
IF Elfsborg
Svenska Cupen: 2013–14
Sweden U21
UEFA European Under-21 Championship: 2015

References

External links

1995 births
Living people
People from Mitrovica, Kosovo
People from Säter Municipality
Association football wingers
Kosovan men's footballers
Kosovo international footballers
Swedish men's footballers
Sweden youth international footballers
Sweden under-21 international footballers]
Expatriate footballers in the Netherlands
Expatriate footballers in France
Kosovan expatriate sportspeople in the Netherlands
Kosovan expatriate sportspeople in France
Swedish expatriate sportspeople in the Netherlands
Swedish expatriate sportspeople in France
Allsvenskan players
IF Elfsborg players
Eredivisie players
SC Heerenveen players
Ligue 1 players
Stade de Reims players
Sportspeople from Dalarna County